Thomas Kevan Fraser (February 23, 1844 – March 16, 1904) was an American leather businessman and politician from New York.

Life 
Fraser was born on February 23, 1844, in New York City, of Scotch-American parentage. His parents were Thomas Fraser and Jane Kevan. The family moved to Hastings-on-Hudson in 1851.

Fraser worked in the hide and leather business. He was first elected to the school board in 1885, and served as its president in 1892. He held various offices in Hastings-on-Hudson, including president of the village for seven consecutive years. He was a member of the Saint Andrew's Society of the State of New York.

In 1891, Fraser was elected to the New York State Assembly as a Democrat, representing the Westchester County 1st District. He served in the Assembly in 1892 and 1893.

Fraser died in Hastings-on-Hudson on March 16, 1904. He was buried in New York City Marble Cemetery.

References

External links 

 The Political Graveyard
 Thomas K. Fraser at Find a Grave

1844 births
1904 deaths
American people of Scottish descent
People from Hastings-on-Hudson, New York
Businesspeople from New York (state)
School board members in New York (state)
19th-century American politicians
Democratic Party members of the New York State Assembly
Burials at New York City Marble Cemetery
19th-century American businesspeople